Xhosa music has long been a major part of the music of South Africa, especially in the field of jazz.  Since olden times, singing has been a tradition and part of culture among the Xhosas.

Xhosa music is characteristically expressive and communicative which includes rhythmical expression of words and sounds. It also includes physical movement employed when clapping, dancing or playing a musical instrument. Different Xhosa chiefdoms share similar musical concepts.

Music in Xhosa Society
Learning traditional music begins with incentive and desire to fully share in the life of the village as almost every occasion of life including play songs for children, the girls' and boys' untshotso song as they grow, the intlombe dance parties, songs and dances of initiation practices, ancestor songs and beer songs. In order to share in the rites and ceremonies, it is necessary to learn the songs. The learning of music happens through observation, attention, developing music memory, practicing and learning rhythms from others.

Xhosa sound
Xhosa overtone singing is based on Xhosa bow instruments such as the 'umrhube' and 'uhadi' which are the two fundamental sounds in Xhosa music. Xhosa traditional musicians imitate the sounds of their musical bows using their voices through the maneuvering of their tongues and shaping of the mouth cavity. They produce overtones by raising the tongue therefore creating a resonance chamber. The characteristic sound of overtone singing is created by tightening the throat muscles to create a low, gutted, rasping sound. This techniques gives particularly women, a deeper voice. Overtone singing is only practiced by women and it is generally the overtone singer who leads the song. Diviners often use overtone singing as they believe that it enables them to speak to the ancestors.

Musical instruments
The uhadi and umrhube is commonly used in Xhosa traditional music, other musical instruments include:

Drums: 
ikawu: This drum is like a shield made from ox-skin that is beaten with a knobkerrie and is slammed into the ground with high forces. It is traditionally played during boys' initiation ceremonies and is accompanied by a special dance performed by the boys. The beating of the ikawu is also accompanied by battle cries.
ingqongqo: This rudimentary drum is made from a stiff dried ox hide and beaten with sticks. The ingqongqo is based upon the hunting shield and the drumsticks of the assegai. A bulls skin is cured and tied on a number of posts three to four feet from the ground. The instrument is played by a group of women with the sticks (amaqoqa). The skin is alternatively placed on the ground, the women sit on it and beat it with the sticks. This drum is no longer found among the Xhosa but, in the past, it was widely used by women during male circumcision ceremonies and diviners ceremonies. The drum has been replaced by modern substitutes such as pieces of cardboard or zinc which is beaten with sticks.

Performers

Amampondo
Dizu Plaatjies
Stompie Mavi
Madosini
Miriam Makeba
Nofinishi Dywili

See also
Uhadi musical bow
The Bow Project

References

Further reading

Music
South African styles of music